Artyom Aleksandrovich Khadjibekov (born April 20, 1970, in Obninsk) is a Russian sport shooter, specializing in the rifles event. He won the gold medal at the 1996 Olympic Games and silver medal at the 2000 Olympic Games in the 10 metre air rifle event. He also competed at 2004, 2008 and 2012 Olympic Games.

Olympic results

Records
Khadjibekov was part of the Soviet team that formerly held the world record in the 50 meter rifle three positions junior event.

External links
Profile on issfnews.com
Scatt Shooter Training System
Scatt online viewer and database

1970 births
Living people
People from Obninsk
Soviet male sport shooters
Russian male sport shooters
ISSF rifle shooters
Olympic shooters of Russia
Shooters at the 1996 Summer Olympics
Shooters at the 2000 Summer Olympics
Shooters at the 2004 Summer Olympics
Shooters at the 2008 Summer Olympics
Shooters at the 2012 Summer Olympics
Olympic gold medalists for Russia
Olympic silver medalists for Russia
Olympic medalists in shooting
Medalists at the 2000 Summer Olympics
Medalists at the 1996 Summer Olympics
Sportspeople from Kaluga Oblast